Naumann is a lunar impact crater located on the Oceanus Procellarum in the northwest sector of the Moon. It is a bowl-shaped, symmetrical crater with a relatively high-albedo rim. There are no notable impact craters overlaying the rim edge or the interior. The nearest named craters are Lichtenberg to the southwest and Nielsen to the southeast. Otherwise it is located in a region of lunar mare which is devoid of significant features.

Satellite craters
By convention these features are identified on lunar maps by placing the letter on the side of the crater midpoint that is closest to Naumann.

References

Bibliography

 
 
 
 
 
 
 
 
 
 
 
 

Impact craters on the Moon